1245 Calvinia is a stony Koronian asteroid from the outer regions of the asteroid belt, approximately  in diameter. It was discovered on 26 May 1932, by South African astronomer Cyril Jackson at the Union Observatory in Johannesburg. The S-type asteroid is likely elongated and has a rotation period of 4.9 hours. It was named for the city of Calvinia in South Africa.

Orbit and classification 

According to Zappalà, Mothé-Diniz, as well as Milani and Knežević, Calvinia is a member of the Koronis family, a very large outer asteroid family with nearly co-planar ecliptical orbits. Interestingly, in one of the most recent and complete synthetic HCM-analysis by Nesvorný, Calvinia is not a Koronian asteroid but belongs to the background population.

It orbits the Sun in the outer main-belt at a distance of 2.7–3.1 AU once every 4 years and 11 months (1,796 days; semi-major axis of 2.89 AU). Its orbit has an eccentricity of 0.08 and an inclination of 3° with respect to the ecliptic. The body's observation arc begins with its official discovery observation at Johannesburg in May 1932.

Naming 

This minor planet was named after the regional city Calvinia in the Cape Province of South Africa. The official  was mentioned in The Names of the Minor Planets by Paul Herget in 1955.

Physical characteristics 

In the Tholen classification, Calvinia is a common stony S-type asteroid, which is also the overall spectral type for members of the Koronis family. In the Barucci taxonomy (1987), it is an S0-type asteroid.

Rotation period 

In October 2017, a rotational lightcurve of Calvinia was obtained from photometric observations by Romain Montaigut, Christophe Gillier and Arnaud Leroy. Lightcurve analysis gave a rotation period of  hours with a brightness variation of 0.28 magnitude.

Other rotational were obtained by (ordered by increasing period determinations ) Brines (4.73 h; Δ0.35 mag; U=3-) in 2016, by Lagerkvist (4.8 h; Δ0.52 mag; U=2) and (4.85 h; Δ0.7 mag; U=2) in 1975 and 1978, respectively, by Erikson (4.84 h; U=3) in 1990, by Slivan (4.8512 h; Δ0.37 mag; U=3) in 2002, by Roy (4.85129 h; Δ0.50 mag; U=3-), and by Tedesco (4.855 h; Δ0.63 mag; U=3) in 1979.

A modeled lightcurve using photometric data from the Lowell Photometric Database was published in 2016. It gave a concurring period of  hours, as well as two spin axes at (52.0°, −51.0°) and (235.0°, −43.0°) in ecliptic coordinates (λ, β).

Diameter and albedo 

According to the surveys carried out by the Infrared Astronomical Satellite IRAS, the Japanese Akari satellite and the NEOWISE mission of NASA's Wide-field Infrared Survey Explorer, Calvinia measures between 26.84 and 30.95 kilometers in diameter and its surface has an albedo between 0.214 and 0.2713. The Collaborative Asteroid Lightcurve Link derives an albedo of 0.2689 and a diameter of 26.83 kilometers based on an absolute magnitude of 9.9.

References

External links 
 Lightcurve Database Query (LCDB), at www.minorplanet.info
 Dictionary of Minor Planet Names, Google books
 Asteroids and comets rotation curves, CdR – Geneva Observatory, Raoul Behrend
 Discovery Circumstances: Numbered Minor Planets (1)-(5000) – Minor Planet Center
 
 

001245
001245
Discoveries by Cyril Jackson (astronomer)
Named minor planets
001245
19320526